Hawaii Clipper was one of three Pan American Airways Martin M-130 flying boats. It disappeared with six passengers and nine crew en route from Guam to Manila, on July 28, 1938.

Trans-Pacific service
Pan American initiated trans-Pacific airmail service on 22 November 1935, and began carrying passengers in October 1936.  The flying boat service between San Francisco Bay and Manila Bay required about 60 hours of flying time over six days, with intermediate stops at Pearl Harbor, Midway Atoll, Wake Island, and Guam. The flight, Trip 229, first took off from Alameda, California.

Disappearance
Hawaii Clipper departed Guam on the last leg of the westbound journey at 11:39 local time on 28 July 1938. The last radio contact was 3 hours 27 minutes later, when the aircraft reported flying through layers of clouds and moderately rough air  from the Philippine coast.

Search for the plane was called off on August 5, 1938. Later tests on the oil samples collected by Meigs indicated no connection with the aircraft. Modern reviews of the events and oil sampling techniques have led some to conclude the test of oil from the tropical Pacific compared to samples from San Francisco were not conclusive in ruling out a link with a slick found close to the last estimated position allowing for ocean currents.

Hawaii Clipper was the first of the initial three long-range flying boats to be lost. It was the worst Pacific airline accident at the time, although fatalities were higher when the other two Martin M-130 flying boats crashed later.  The Philippine Clipper crash of 1943 killed 19, and 23 were killed when China Clipper crashed in 1945.

See also
Malaysia Airlines Flight 370

References

External links
Air Safety Board of the Civil Aeronautics Authority
Preliminary Report (PDF)
Summary of preliminary report (PDF)

Aviation accidents and incidents in 1938
Aviation accidents and incidents in the Pacific Ocean
Airliner accidents and incidents in the United States
Individual aircraft
Missing aircraft
Pan Am
Pan Am accidents and incidents
1938 disasters in Oceania